Mountains Are Free is a children's historical novel by Julia Davis Adams set in Switzerland in the 14th century. It retells the legend of William Tell and the Swiss struggle against the Habsburgs from the viewpoint of an orphan boy. The novel, illustrated by Theodore Nadajen, was first published in 1930 and was a Newbery Honor recipient in 1931.

References

1930 American novels
Children's historical novels
American children's novels
Newbery Honor-winning works
Novels set in Switzerland
Novels about orphans
Novels set in the 14th century
1930 children's books
Cultural depictions of William Tell